WDOG-FM (93.5 MHz) is a country music radio station in Allendale, South Carolina.  During the day, it plays country from the past and present, as well as southern rock.  At night, it plays urban contemporary music

WDOG-FM has South Carolina Gamecocks radio coverage, while WDOG-AM has the Clemson Tigers football.

External links
www.bigdogradio.com/

DOG-FM